Beverly Unitarian Church is a Unitarian Universalist ("UU") church in Chicago, Illinois.

The church formed in 1951 by the merger of two congregations: the Beverly Unitarian Fellowship, which had begun in 1941, and the People's Liberal Church founded in 1878. People's Liberal Church was known by a variety of names over the years: In 1878 it was called the Unitarian Universalist Christian Union Society of Englewood, or simply the Christian Union Society; in 1880 on moving to a new building, it was named First Universalist Church of Englewood; in 1889 it moved to a larger building and was called Stewart Avenue Universalist Church.

The Givins Irish Castle
The current church building, called the "Irish Castle" was built from 1886 to 1887 under the direction of Robert C. Givins, a successful real estate developer. It is a three-story structure with three crenelated towers. Givins lived in the castle from 1887 to 1894, then from 1895 to 1897 the castle housed the Chicago Female College. Beverly Unitarian Church purchased the building for $14,000 and has used it since 1942. It is the only building in the city described as a "castle."

It has been claimed to be haunted.

Ministers

People's Church prior to merger
 1878-1892 - Rev. Florence E. Kollock (at the People's Liberal Church of Chicago, then called alternately The Christian Union, and The First Universalist Society of Englewood)
 1892-1936 - Rev. Rufus Austin White (at The People's Liberal Church of Chicago)
 1939-1944 - Donald S. Harrington (at The People's Liberal Church of Chicago, and 1942–1944 at Beverly Unitarian Fellowship as well)
 Robert S. Hoagland
 Willim D. Hammond
 Hartley C. Ray

Beverly Unitarian Society prior to merger
 1941-1942 - Lon Ray Call
 1942-1944 - Donald S. Harrington 
 1944-1946 - Jack Mendelsohn
 1947-1950 - William Hammond
 1946-19xx - Helgi I. S. Borgford

After merger
 1950-1953 - Hartley Cabot Ray
 1954-1963 Vincent Silliman
 1964-1970 Hunter Leggit, Jr.
 1970-1971 John Lester Young (interim)
 1971-1979 Robert L. Schaibly
 1980-1991 Roger Brewin
 1992-1993 Thomas Payne (interim)
 1994-2003 Leonette Bugleisi
 2003-2005 Jim Hobart (interim)
 2005-2008 Karen Matteson
 2008-2009 Ana Levy-Lyons
 2009-2014 Neil Shadle
 20XX-2014 Nan Hobart 
 2014-2016 Karen Mooney
 2016-2017 John Smith
 2017–2021 David Schwartz

References

External links
 
 Chicago's Only Castle Documentary Website
 Givins Beverly Castle

Churches in Chicago
Unitarian Universalism in Illinois
Unitarian Universalist churches in Illinois